Fiona Geminder is an Australian businesswoman, most notable for being associated with Visy and PACT Group Holdings. She is the third richest woman in Australia. With a net worth of USD 3.3 billion, she is listed as the 891th richest person in the world by Forbes magazine.

Early life 

She is the daughter of the late Richard Pratt and Jeanne Pratt.

She is the sister of the billionaire businessman Anthony Pratt (businessman).

Her husband is Raphael Geminder, who is yet another Australian billionaire businessman.

Education 

She completed her Bachelor of Arts at Monash University in 1985.
She also completed her law degree at Monash University in 2008.

Career

Kin Group 

She has also served as a director of the Kin Group of companies since 2017.

Philanthropy 

She has taken a keen interest in philanthropy. She is an active member of the Pratt Foundation, which is the philanthropic organisation founded by her family.

Personal life 
She is married to Raphael Geminder, who is equally notable for being the 90th richest businessman in Australia. Their daughter Georgia Geminder left a career of fashion modelling to start her own herbal toothpaste company.

References

External links 

 LinkedIn Profile
 Monash University Alumni Site

Living people
Australian billionaires
Businesspeople from Sydney
Australian chief executives
Businesspeople from Melbourne
Year of birth missing (living people)